Vincent A. Timphony (March 8, 1934 - December 13, 2010) was an American trainer of Thoroughbred racehorses best remembered for winning the 1984 inaugural running of the Breeders' Cup Classic, the first $3-million horse race.

A native of New Orleans, Vincent Timphony had a career year in 1984 with his horse of a lifetime, Wild Again. The 31–1 longshot capped it off at Hollywood Park Racetrack with a win over a very strong field in the Breeders' Cup Classic. In what remains as one of the most memorable finishes in the race's history, Wild Again left behind the likes of future U. S. Racing Hall of Famer Precisionist and that year's Hollywood Gold Cup winner Desert Wine before battling down the stretch against another future Hall of Fame inductee Slew o' Gold and that year's Preakness Stakes winner, Gate Dancer.

An inveterate bettor, Vincent Timphony's faith in his horse saw him bet heavily on Wild Again to win the Classic. Years later the Los Angeles Times reported his wife had said her husband's gambling winnings that day were "more than $100,000."

External links
1984 Video of the 1984 Breeders' Cup Classic

References

1934 births
2010 deaths
American horse trainers
Sportspeople from New Orleans